Valoctocogene roxaparvovec, sold under the brand name Roctavian, is a gene therapy for the treatment of hemophilia A. It was developed by BioMarin Pharmaceutical. Valoctocogene roxaparvovec is made of a virus (AAV5) that has been modified to contain the gene for factor VIII, which is lacking in patients with haemophilia A. It is given by intravenous infusion.

The most common side effects include increased levels of the liver enzymes alanine aminotransferase and aspartate aminotransferase (signs of possible liver problems), increased levels of the enzyme lactate dehydrogenase (sign of possible tissue damage), nausea (feeling sick) and headache.

Valoctocogene roxaparvovec was approved for medical use in the European Union in August 2022.

Medical uses 
Valoctocogene roxaparvovec is indicated for the treatment of severe haemophilia A (congenital factor VIII deficiency) in adults without a history of factor VIII inhibitors and without detectable antibodies to adeno-associated virus serotype 5 (AAV5).

Mechanism of action 
Valoctocogene roxaparvovec is a gene therapy that uses an adeno-associated virus 5 (AAV5) that codes for human Factor VIII, together with a human liver-specific promoter that encourages translation in hepatocytes, not liver endothelial and sinusoidal cells, where Factor VIII is ordinarily synthesised.

History 
The US Food and Drug Administration granted valoctocogene roxaparvovec orphan drug status in 2016, and breakthrough therapy designation in 2017. 

However, in late August 2020, BioMarin received a Complete Response Letter from the FDA, indicating that its Biologics License Application (which would have made valoctocogene roxaparvovec the first gene therapy to be approved for a bleeding disorder) would not be approved. The regulator was concerned that differences between results from the phase I/II trials (the 270-201 study) and the phase III trial (the 270-301 study) were too dissimilar with regard to durability, the latter suggesting that the protective effect of valoctocogene roxaparvovec wore off after approx. 12-18 months.

Society and culture

Legal status 
On 23 June 2022, the Committee for Medicinal Products for Human Use (CHMP) of the European Medicines Agency (EMA) adopted a positive opinion, recommending the granting of a conditional marketing authorization for the medicinal product Roctavian, intended for the treatment of severe haemophilia A. As Roctavian is an advanced therapy medicinal product, the CHMP positive opinion is based on an assessment by the Committee for Advanced Therapies. The applicant for this medicinal product is BioMarin International Limited. Valoctocogene roxaparvovec was approved for medical use in the European Union in August 2022.

References

External links 
 

Antihemorrhagics
Breakthrough therapy
Drugs that are a gene therapy
Gene therapy
Haemophilia
Orphan drugs